IVPN is a VPN service offered by Privatus Limited based in Gibraltar. Privatus Limited has been independently audited by cure53 and has undergone a no-logging audit  and a comprehensive pentest report. They accept Bitcoin, Monero, PayPal, Credit Cards, and Cash as payment methods and all of their clients are open source. IVPN is one of the few VPN services with support by FlashRouters, a company that specializes in providing custom-flashed routers for VPN users.

Reception 
In September 2017, PCWorld in their review wrote that the service is dearer than other VPN providers, it has good bandwidth speeds and has a transparent privacy policy.

The service has also been reviewed by PC Magazine, and TorrentFreak.

See also 

 Comparison of virtual private network services
 Internet privacy
 Encryption
 Secure communication
 List of free and open-source Android applications

References

External links 
 
 
 

Internet privacy
Virtual private network services